Lasiocroton macrophyllus is a species of plant in the family Euphorbiaceae. It is endemic to Jamaica.

References

Adelieae
Near threatened plants
Endemic flora of Jamaica
Taxonomy articles created by Polbot